Erysiphe is a genus of fungi in the family Erysiphaceae. Many of the species in this genus are plant pathogens which cause powdery mildew.

Species
This genus includes, but is not limited to the following species:
 Erysiphe alphitoides
 Erysiphe azerbaijanica
 Erysiphe betae
 Erysiphe brunneopunctata
 Erysiphe cichoracearum
 Erysiphe communis
 Erysiphe cruciferarum
 Erysiphe fernandoae
 Erysiphe flexuosa
 Erysiphe heraclei
 Erysiphe lespedezae 
 Erysiphe michikoae
 Erysiphe nitida
 Erysiphe pisi Erysiphe polygoni Erysiphe robiniae Erysiphe syringaeFormer species
 Blumeria graminis Uncinula necator''

References

 
Fungal plant pathogens and diseases
Leotiomycetes genera